Original Sin – The Collection is a compilation album by Australian rock band INXS released on 21 September 2004. It spans their earliest six studio albums INXS (1980), Underneath the Colours (1981), Shabooh Shoobah (1982), The Swing (1984), Listen Like Thieves (1985) and Kick (1987). It is not to be confused with their 2010 release, Original Sin, nor the single of the same name from 1984.

Reception

Allmusic's James Christopher Monger felt the album was "more of a sampler than a 'greatest-hits' package" which provides three tracks from each of their earliest six albums.

Track listing

References

Albums produced by Chris Thomas (record producer)
Albums produced by Nick Launay
Albums produced by Nile Rodgers
INXS compilation albums
2004 compilation albums